Andriy Pylyavskyi (born 4 December 1988) is a professional Ukrainian football defender.

Pylyavskyi is an alumnus of the youth academy "Athlete" in Kyiv and of FC Shakhtar Donetsk sports school.

Club career 
Began playing at age 7 Club neighborhood next to his home in Kiev, capital of Ukraine. Five years later, the team was invited to the tournament which also involved a teams of children of Shakhtar Donetsk, one of the biggest clubs in the country.

Passed all the youth department groups but was not included in the adult group who preferred to bring foreign players named. At the age of 17 moved to Arsenal Kyiv.

Upon his arrival, he was sent to play in the reserves from which came the first team, but after a few weeks had struck him injury severe meniscus knee strike for half a year.

At the end of the recovery period, it was decided to release him unconditionally and Andriy had to play the regional league. He signed in Knyaz Stz'stliwih second division club and here having suffered economic hardship.

His misfortune continued in Nafkom After catching a permanent lineup, the team disbanded and brake tall (1.93 m) moved to Nyva Vinnytsia, a representative of City Center District Second Division found. After ranking second and qualified for the Premier League due to the breakup of the team that won the championship.

Signed by Maccabi Haifa in January 2011.
After a great half season with Maccabi, it was decided that Maccabi will sign Pylyavskyi on a contract.
In the first season with Maccabi Haifa Pylyavskyi won the championship and lost in the cup final. Pylyavskyi was one of the best player this season, although he arrived to Maccabi in January.

on 2011–12 UEFA Champions League Third qualifying round, 27 July 2011, against Maribor Pylyavskyi injured and Maccabi decided to lend him to Beitar Jerusalem and Pylyavskyi showed good performances during the season and helped them stay in the league.

He scored his debut goal against Hapoel Acre in the Toto Cup.

In 2012–13 season Pylyavskyi scored a dramatic goal in the 95th minute to help his team beat Bnei Yehuda 1:0. In June 2013, he signed a one-year contract extension to stay with Maccabi Haifa.

On 10 February 2016, he signed with the Russian side FC Rubin Kazan.

Club career statistics
(correct as of December 2011)

Honours
Israeli Premier League (1):
2010–11

References

External links
 
 

1988 births
Living people
Ukrainian footballers
FC Nafkom Brovary players
FC Nyva Vinnytsia players
Maccabi Haifa F.C. players
Beitar Jerusalem F.C. players
Expatriate footballers in Israel
Ukrainian expatriate footballers
Israeli Premier League players
FC Arsenal Kyiv players
FC Zorya Luhansk players
Ukrainian Premier League players
Ukrainian First League players
Ukrainian Second League players
Ukraine international footballers
FC Rubin Kazan players
Expatriate footballers in Russia
Russian Premier League players
Ukrainian expatriate sportspeople in Israel
Ukrainian expatriate sportspeople in Russia
FC Vorskla Poltava players
Association football defenders